Zvare (Georgian: ზვარე) is a village in Georgia, in Kharagauli Municipality of Imereti Region. It is located on the western slope of the Likhi Range, on the bank of the river Zvariuli (left tributary of the Chkherimela). 700 m above sea level 24 km from Kharagauli.

Resort 
Zvare is a balneological resort of local importance due to the presence of mineral water sources.

References 

Populated places in Kharagauli Municipality
Spa towns in Georgia (country)